Tetratricopeptide repeat domain 28 is a protein that in humans is encoded by the TTC28 gene.

References

Further reading 

 
 

Genes
Human proteins